is a city located in Shiga Prefecture, Japan. , the city had an estimated population of 82,233 in 34747 households and a population density of 570 persons per km2.

Geography
Ōmihachiman is located in central Shiga Prefecture, on flatlands along the eastern shore of Lake Biwa, and extending inland to the foothills of the Suzuka Mountains.

Neighboring municipalities
Shiga Prefecture
Higashiōmi
Yasu
Ryūō

Climate
Ōmihachiman has a Humid subtropical climate (Köppen Cfa) characterized by warm summers and cool winters with light to no snowfall.  The average annual temperature in Ōmihachiman is 14.7 °C. The average annual rainfall is 1602 mm with September as the wettest month. The temperatures are highest on average in August, at around 26.6 °C, and lowest in January, at around 3.7 °C.

Demographics
Per Japanese census data, the population of Ōmihachiman has recently plateaued after several decades of growth.

History
Ōmihachiman is part of ancient  Ōmi Province and was originally a post station that developed around Musa-juku on the Tōsandō (later the Nakasendō) highway connecting Heian-kyō with the eastern provinces. During the Sengoku period, the warlord Oda Nobunaga built Azuchi Castle in the hills on the border with Higashiōmi. Under  Toyotomi Hidetsugu the center shirted to a castle town at the base of Hachimanyama Castle, which attracted many merchants ("Ōmi shōnin"), especially after the destruction of Azuchi Castle. Former merchant's residences and a canal used for transport are preserved in an old city area, designated a Preservation District for Groups of Traditional Buildings and an Important Cultural Landscape.

The town of Hachiman was established with Gamō District, Shiga with the creation of the modern municipalities system on April 1, 1889. In 1905, an American architect William Merrell Vories came to Ōmihachiman as an English language teacher at commercial high school. Two years later he resigned the original work, but he remained in Ōmihachiman and spent most of his productive life here. He handed down western-style buildings, a pharmaceutical company, an educational foundation and a hospital to the city. The town expanded by annexing the neighboring villages of Utsuro in 1933 and Shima in 1951. On March 31, 1954, Hachiman merged with the villages of Okayama, Kanada, Kirihara and Mabuchi to form the city of Ōmihachiman. The name was changed from "Hachiman" to "Ōmihachiman" to avoid confusion with the then existing city of Yahata in Fukuoka Prefecture, as both "Hachiman" and "Yawata" are written in the same kanji characters.  On March 21, 2010, the town of Azuchi was merged into Ōmihachiman.

Government
Ōmihachiman has a mayor-council form of government with a directly elected mayor and a unicameral city council of 24 members. Ōmihachiman contributes three members to the Shiga Prefectural Assembly. In terms of national politics, the city is part of Shiga 4th district of the lower house of the Diet of Japan.

Economy
Agriculture, commercial fishing and seasonal tourism are major components of the economy of Ōmihachiman. The key industries of Ōmihachiman include the manufacturing of pharmaceuticals.

Education
Ōmihachiman has 12 public elementary schools and four public middle schools operated by the city government and three high schools operated by the Shiga Prefectural Department of Education. The city also has one private elementary school, one private middle school and one private high school.

Transportation

Railway
 JR West – Biwako Line
  -   - 
 Ohmi Railway – Main Line
  -

Highway

Sister cities

Within Japan 
 Fujinomiya, Shizuoka
 Matsumae, Hokkaidō

Outside Japan 
   Leavenworth, Kansas, United States, sister city, since 1997
   Grand Rapids, Michigan, United States, friendship city, since 1986
  Miryang, Gyeongsangnam-do, South Korea, friendship city, since 1994
  Mantua, Lombardy, Italy, friendship city, since 2005

Places of interest
Hachiman area
 Himure Hachiman-gū - The largest shrine in Ōmihachiman and the origin of the city name "Hachiman".
 Sagichō Festival - A fire festival in every March which is held in the old city area and the Himure Hachimangū.
 Hachimanyama Castle - Toyotomi Hidetsugu's castle. Hachimanyama Ropeway services between the mountaintop and Himure Hachimangū.
 Hachiman-bori canal
 Suigō meguri - In the northeast of the city central, sightseeing boats service through the rural lagoon.
 Kawara Museum
Dainaka Lake Minami Site, Yayoi period settlement trace, National Historic Site
 Lake Biwa
  - A fishing island which is the only inhabited lake island in Japan.
 Isaki no Sao-tobi - A water festival in every August which tests men's courage to jump into the lake from the Isaki Temple.
 Musa-juku
Azuchi area
 Azuchi Castle, Special National Historic Site
 Kannonji Castle ruins, National Historic Site
Chōmei-ji, 31st temple of the 
Kannonshō-ji, 32nd temple of the 
Yukinoyama Kofun, National Historic Site
Azuchi-Hyōtanyama Kofun, National Historic Site
Oiso Shrine, National Historic Site

Notable people
 Kota Aoki, football player
 Takashi Inui, football player
Tatsuo Kawabata, politician
Miku Tanabe, entertainer
Kazuyo Matsui, actress
 Rorochan_1999 (1999–2013), died aged 14 while livestreaming, and notable subject of internet suicide.

References

External links 

  
 Ōmihachiman Tourism Association 

Cities in Shiga Prefecture